Mihić may refer to:

 Gordan Mihić (1938–2019), Serbian playwright
 Lovro Mihić (born 1994), Croatian handball player
 Miljenko Mihić (1933–2009), Bosnian Serb football coach
 Mirko Mihić (born 1965), Serbian football coach

See also
 Miho
 Mihael
 Mihailo
 Mihajlo

Serbian surnames
Croatian surnames
Surnames from given names